Ginglymocladus luteicollis is a species of false soldier beetle in the family Omethidae. It is found in North America.

References

Elateroidea
Articles created by Qbugbot
Beetles described in 1918